Pedro Miguel Oliveira Correia (born 3 November 1988) is a Portuguese footballer who plays for Paredes as a forward.

Football career
On 9 August 2015, Correia made his professional debut with Famalicão in a 2015–16 Segunda Liga match against Varzim.

References

External links

Stats and profile at LPFP 

1988 births
People from Vila Nova de Famalicão
Living people
Portuguese footballers
Association football forwards
F.C. Tirsense players
Rebordosa A.C. players
AD Oliveirense players
F.C. Famalicão players
F.C. Vizela players
F.C. Felgueiras 1932 players
AD Fafe players
U.S.C. Paredes players
Liga Portugal 2 players
Sportspeople from Braga District